Sam Querrey was the defending champion, but chose not to compete this year.

Seeds

Draw

Finals

Top half

Bottom half

References
 Main draw
 Qualifying draw

2015 ATP Challenger Tour
2015 Singles